Shrikaran Sharda is an Indian politician and was the member of 6th Lok Sabha. He was elected to Ajmer in 1977 Indian general election as a member of Janata Party. He was previously associated with Indian National Congress, Socialist Party and Bharatiya Jana Sangh

References

1919 births
Year of death missing
India MPs 1977–1979
Janata Party politicians
Indian National Congress politicians
Bharatiya Jana Sangh politicians
Bharatiya Lok Dal politicians
People from Ajmer
Lok Sabha members from Rajasthan